Madeleine Férat is an 1868 novel by the French writer Émile Zola. It was Zola's fourth novel, written immediately after Thérèse Raquin, which had been Zola's first commercial and artistic success.

Madeleine Ferat deals with a beautiful woman in love with her husband William, but hopelessly attracted to her former lover, Jacques. This obsession leads to the destruction of her life, her marriage, and eventually drives her to suicide, while her husband, for his part, goes insane.

Adaptation
In 1920 it was turned into an Italian silent film, Maddalena Ferat, directed by Roberto Roberti and Febo Mari and starring Francesca Bertini.

References

Bibliography
 Anna Gural & Robert Singer. Zola and Film: Essays in the Art of Adaptation. McFarland, 2005.

1868 French novels
Novels by Émile Zola
French novels adapted into films